Naughty Dallas is a 1964 American film about a small town girl who arrives in Dallas determined to become a stripper, directed by Larry Buchanan.

It was claimed this movie was partly shot in Jack Ruby's nightclub, but this has been discounted. There was also a rumour Buchanan shot footage of Jack Ruby.

References

External links

Naughty Dallas at TCMDB

1964 films
Films directed by Larry Buchanan
1960s English-language films